Dimitrios Kourbelis (born 2 November 1993) is a Greek professional footballer who plays mainly as a defensive midfielder, but occasionally also as a centreback. He is the captain of Super League club Panathinaikos, and he represents the Greece national team.

Club career

Asteras Tripolis
On 31 May 2015, Kourbelis reached 100 appearances for Asteras Tripolis and scored his first goal in 2014–15 playoffs against Atromitos. He made 131 appearances across all competitions during his career at Tripolis.

Panathinaikos
On 23 December 2016, Kourbelis signed a 3.5-season contract with Greek club Panathinaikos and was officially announced by Athens club, on an annual fee of €250,000. Panathinaikos will pay €500,000 to his former club during the next three seasons, along with a 25% next transfer percentage and some appearances and targets bonus, which could increase the cost of 23-year-old international's move to the team of manager Marinos Ouzounidis to €700,000. The Greek international quickly earned respect within the club and his quick transition from Asteras Tripolis to Panathinaikos proved his ability to overcome new challenges. On 5 January 2017, he made his debut with the club playing as a starter in a 1–0 away loss against Platanias and ever since, Kourbelis has become an irreplaceable option in Panathinaikos. 

After the sale of Zeca to Copenhagen, despite the fact that he had spent only 8 months with the club, he was appointed as the new captain for the 2017–18 season.

On 13 January 2018, according to Live Sport athletic newspaper, Genoa offered about €2 million to the financially struggling Panathinaikos, in order to secure the 24-year-old international defensive midfielder and captain of the club in the January transfer window, without ignoring other German and Italian clubs that asked about the market value of the player. At the last week of the 2018 January transfer window, PAOK submitted a proposal to financial struggling Panathinaikos for the acquisition of the international midfielder. PAOK are offering Panathinaikos €1.5 million for Kourbelis, including the services of Ergys Kaçe, Giannis Mystakidis and Dimitris Konstantinidis for the second half of this season, but the player is reluctant for this transfer, besides the annual fee of €450,000. At the last day of the January transfer window, the administration of PAOK did not manage to reach an agreement with Kourbelis, while Sampdoria will try to capture Panathinaikos' captain. The 25-year old defensive midfielder wants to compete in a team abroad with the Italian club eyeing his case. The Genova's team is willing to offer about €2 million for Kourbelis and a news update is expected. Nevertheless, Panathinaikos maybe capture either Konstantinidis, Kaçe and Mystakidis regardless the Kourbelis future. Eventually, the captain of Panathinaikos will remained at the club for the rest of the season. On 3 February 2018, Kourbelis suffered an injury during the first half of a home game against Panetolikos. He was expected to remain out of action for 3–4 weeks and his absence was a blow for the plans of Panathinaikos' manager Marinos Ouzounidis.

On 1 September 2018, he scored his first goal for the club in all competitions, with a penalty kick after 21-year-old winger Tasos Chatzigiovanis was fouled in the box by Lamia's goalscorer Daniel Adejo, sealing a 3–1 home win game. On 24 November 2018, Kourbelis scored as Tasos Chatzigiovanis squared the ball for the captain. His initial shot struck Apollon defender Klodian Gino, but the ball fell favorably for Kourbelis to score from the rebound, in a hammering 5–1 home win game against struggling Apollon Smyrnis.

On 27 November 2019, he renewed his contract with the club until the summer of 2023 for an undisclosed fee. On 22 January 2020, the Greek international defender let fly with an unstoppable shot from just outside the penalty area which left Balázs Megyeri no chance, in a hammering 3–0 home win game against Atromitos. On 1 July 2020, the Greece international midfielder made a vital interception before striding forward and beat Fabian Ehmann with four minutes to go to the interval, giving the lead in a 2–0 home win game against Aris. On 6 December 2020, he scored his first goal in the 2020-21 season, leading to a vital 2-1 away win against rivals AEK Athens. On 17 December 2020, he faced a tear in the abductor muscle that kept him out of the squad for six months. After a very difficult year for the defender marred by injury (425 days to be exact), Kourbelis returned to action in an away 2021-22 Greek Cup quarterfinals game against Anagennisi Karditsa F.C. in February 2022.

International career
On 9 June 2017, Kourbelis earned Michael Skibbe's first call to Greece national team as a result of his remarkable appearances at Panathinaikos. On the same match, he officially debuted in the Greece national team coming on as a late substitute in a 0–0 away draw against Bosnia and Herzegovina for the 2018 FIFA World Cup qualifications. He scored his first goal on 30th of May 2019 during a friendly game against Turkey.

Career statistics

Club

(* Include Superleague Greece Playoffs)
(** Include UEFA Europa League)
(*** Include UEFA Europa Conference League)

International

International goals
Scores and results list Greece's goal tally first.

Honours
Asteras Tripolis
Greek Cup runner-up: 2012–13
Panathinaikos
Greek Cup : 2021–22
Greece U19
UEFA European Under-19 Championship runner-up: 2012
Individual
Super League Greece Team of the Year: 2017–18, 2018–19, 2019–20

References

External links

1993 births
Living people
Greek footballers
Association football midfielders
Greece youth international footballers
Greece under-21 international footballers
Greece international footballers
Asteras Tripolis F.C. players
Panathinaikos F.C. players
Super League Greece players
People from North Kynouria
Footballers from the Peloponnese